Josef Schreiber (24 December 1919  – missing as of 1 February 1945) was an Oberfeldwebel in the Wehrmacht during World War II. He was the namesake of the Oberfeldwebel-Schreiber barracks in Immendingen which was closed in March 2016.

Bundeswehr's role model

His actions leading to the presentations of Knight's Cross of the Iron Cross with Oak Leaves made him a role model in the Bundeswehr. During Operation Citadel, on his own initiative, he led an attack against Soviet trenches, forcing the enemy to retreat. In August 1943, supported by 30 soldiers, he again forced the Soviets to retreat at Karachev. On 27 May 1967, the Bundeswehr named the barracks at Immendingen the Oberfeldwebel-Schreiber barracks.

Awards and decorations
 Infantry Assault Badge (16 August 1941)
 Iron Cross (1939)
 2nd Class (10 September 1941)
 1st Class (18 September 1941)
 Knight's Cross of the Iron Cross with Oak Leaves
 Knight's Cross on 31 March 1943 as Feldwebel and Zugführer (platoon leader) in the 4./Sturm-Regiment 14
 309th Oak Leaves on 5 October 1943 as Oberfeldwebel and Zugführer (platoon leader) in the 7./Sturm-Regiment 14
Close Combat Clasp
 in Bronze (?)
 in Silver (20 October 1943)

References

Citations

Bibliography

 
 
 
 
 

1919 births
Recipients of the Knight's Cross of the Iron Cross with Oak Leaves
German Army personnel killed in World War II
1945 deaths
Missing in action of World War II
People from Konstanz (district)
People from the Republic of Baden
Military personnel from Baden-Württemberg
German Army officers of World War II